Petrophile carduacea is a species of flowering plant in the family Proteaceae and is endemic to southwestern Western Australia. It is a shrub with deeply toothed leaves, and more or less spherical heads of hairy yellow flowers.

Description

Taxonomy
Petrophile carduacea was first formally described in 1856 by Carl Meissner in de Candolle's Prodromus Systematis Naturalis Regni Vegetabilis from material collected by James Drummond. The specific epithet (carduacea) means "thistle-like".

Distribution and habitat
This petrophile grows in scrub and heath in and near the Stirling Range in the Esperance Plains and Jarrah Forest biogeographic regions of southwestern Western Australia.

Conservation status
Petrophile carduacea is classified as "Priority Two" by the Western Australian Government Department of Parks and Wildlife meaning that it is poorly known and from only one or a few locations.

References

Eudicots of Western Australia
carduacea
Endemic flora of Western Australia
Plants described in 1856
Taxa named by Carl Meissner